Rilany Aguiar da Silva (born 26 June 1986), known simply as Rilany, is a Brazilian former professional footballer who played as a defender for the Brazil women's national team and clubs in Brazil, Sweden, Iceland, Spain, and Portugal.

Club career
Rilany transferred from Ferroviária to Tyresö in January 2014, as one of four Brazilians to join the Swedish club.

Rilany was an unused substitute in Tyresö's 4–3 defeat by Wolfsburg in the 2014 UEFA Women's Champions League Final. Tyresö became insolvent in 2014 and were kicked out of the 2014 Damallsvenskan season, expunging all their results and making all their players free agents. The Stockholm County Administrative Board published the players' salaries, showing Rilany was a middle-range earner at SEK 37 170 per-month.

Despite interest from other foreign clubs she was happy to agree a return to Ferroviária in July 2014. Following spells with Grindavík and Atlético Madrid, Rilany signed for Benfica in December 2018. She had signed with Atlético in July 2018, but her contract was cancelled in October 2018 without her playing for the team.

International career

Rilany's senior debut for Brazil came in November 2013; in a 4–1 defeat by the United States at Florida Citrus Bowl Stadium.

Honours
Benfica
 Campeonato Nacional II Divisão Feminino: 2018–19
 Taça de Portugal: 2018–19
International
 Copa América Femenina: 2018

References

External links

 

1986 births
Living people
People from Jacareí
Brazilian women's footballers
Brazil women's international footballers
Brazilian expatriate sportspeople in Spain
Expatriate women's footballers in Spain
Brazilian expatriate women's footballers
Tyresö FF players
Expatriate women's footballers in Sweden
Footballers from São Paulo (state)
Women's association football fullbacks
Associação Ferroviária de Esportes (women) players
Úrvalsdeild kvenna (football) players
Grindavík women's football players
Expatriate women's footballers in Iceland
Brazilian expatriate sportspeople in Iceland
Atlético Madrid Femenino players
Santos FC (women) players
S.L. Benfica (women) footballers
Expatriate women's footballers in Portugal
Botucatu Futebol Clube players
Damallsvenskan players